Kurt Anthony Tippett (born 8 May 1987) is a former professional Australian rules footballer who played for the Sydney Swans. He also played for the Adelaide Football Club between 2007 and 2012. Tippett represented Queensland in under-18 basketball before transferring to Australian rules football and playing for Southport Football Club. He was selected by Adelaide in the 2006 AFL draft.

Early life and junior football

Tippett was born in Sydney, New South Wales but moved to the Gold Coast, Queensland at two months of age. He is the brother of former AFL player Joel Tippett and professional Netball player Gretel Bueta. Tippett attended All Saints Anglican College during his high school years where he first trialed Australian rules football in an inter-school sports tournament in 2004. His first love was basketball however and at eleven years of age, and made his representative debut for the Gold Coast. In 2004, he represented Queensland in the under 18 championships and was given a spot on the Brisbane Bullets development squad. While competing in the under 18 championships, Tippett competed against the likes of Patrick Mills, Joe Ingles and future AFL player Scott Pendlebury. He also toured the United States with the Queensland Academy of Sport team.

Upon returning from the United States, he accepted an offer from the Gold Coast Stingrays to try out for their Australian rules football representative team. He made the team and they went on to be crowned state champions. Following the victory he joined  for their 2005 season and after a few games in the reserves he made his seniors debut at the Gabba against the Brisbane Lions reserves team and matched up on AFL premiership player Jamie Charman. Kurt would end 2005 with Southport's reserves best and fairest award while playing in ten senior matches for the season. He then went on to represent Queensland in the 2006 AFL Under 18 Championships where they would go undefeated through the tournament to win the division two title. He would also be the second highest goal kicker during Southport's 2006 premiership winning season.

AFL career

Adelaide (2008–2012)

Tippett was drafted by the Adelaide Football Club with the thirty-second pick in the 2006 AFL draft. He made his debut in round one in the 2008 season against  at the Telstra Dome. Playing as a key forward and ruckman, he became a regular in the side, but was often criticized for his inaccurate kicking at goal. At the Crows Club Champion evening, he received a 2008 Rising Star Nomination.

By the next season, Tippett had begun to develop into a potent tall forward. A bag of seven goals and a high mark against  in round 11 showed his potential to become the high-scoring key forward that Adelaide had lacked since the departure of Tony Modra, and with successive bags of five against  and  he showed he could perform on a regular basis. He finished the home-and-away season with forty-seven goals, second behind only Jason Porplyzia – with fifty-two goals – in the club's goalkicking. He kicked eight more goals in the finals to finish with fifty-five for the year. His sixty metre goal from the boundary line gave Adelaide a one point lead against  in the last minute of the 2009 semi final; however, this went in vain as opposing forward Jack Anthony restored Collingwood's lead seconds later, resulting in a loss.

In 2009. he signed a three-year deal with Adelaide, preventing the soon-to-be Gold Coast club from recruiting him as one of their un-contracted player signings. In 2010 Tippett was Adelaide's leading goalkicker.

2012 trade controversy
On 6 October 2012, it was announced Tippett had requested a trade to the Sydney Swans. Criticism was later heard from many people, two of which were Crows legend Mark Ricciuto, who said that Tippett was a money driver and former Hawthorn president Jeff Kennett who angrily said the Swans should be stripped of money on trying to get him.

Although things shifted, when it was revealed Tippett and Adelaide had breached AFL rules regarding his contract. Tippett was offered money not stipulated under the club's salary cap. As a result, the club was fined and lost its first two draft picks in the 2012 and 2013 national drafts, while Tippett was fined and suspended for eleven matches. The proposed trade to Sydney was blocked by the AFL, with Sydney eventually picking him up in the pre-season draft, while Adelaide lost Tippett for nothing.

Sydney (2013–2019)
Tippett debuted for the Swans in round 13 of the 2013 AFL season when Sydney played  at AAMI Stadium. He kicked a goal in the first minute, finished with two, and collected six possessions. Although missing the first eleven rounds of the season, Tippett showed his prowess in front of the goals winning the Swans' leading goal kicker award.

After an injury interrupted start to the year, Tippett would play his first game for 2014 in round eight against Hawthorn, kicking four goals. He would go on to play the next two games showing good signs before tearing the meniscus in his right knee. He returned against  but was in and out of the side due to his troublesome knee. He would then go on to play in his first grand final, only to lose to the Hawks, kicking one goal from sixteen disposals for the match.

Tippett announced his immediate retirement in January 2018 just two months prior to the start of the 2018 season. The effects of a lingering ankle injury was referred to as his key consideration. Tippett had also suffered various hamstring, hip and ankle injuries in the two years prior.

Tippett was drafted by the Swans in the 2018 AFL rookie draft with pick 42, after previously reaching an agreement with the Swans as per his retirement settlement. Due to AFL salary cap rules, the Swans would need to pay the remainder of his settlement within the salary cap, while Tippett would have to remain a listed player.

Statistics

|- style="background-color: #EAEAEA"
! scope="row" style="text-align:center" | 2008
|
| 4 || 19 || 17 || 17 || 70 || 65 || 135 || 44 || 32 || 118 || 0.9 || 0.9 || 3.7 || 3.4 || 7.1 || 2.3 || 1.7 || 6.2
|- 
! scope="row" style="text-align:center" | 2009
|
| 4 || 24 || 55 || 31 || 160 || 98 || 258 || 96 || 60 || 243 || 2.3 || 1.3 || 6.7 || 4.1 || 10.8 || 4.0 || 2.5 || 10.1
|- style="background-color: #EAEAEA"
! scope="row" style="text-align:center" | 2010
|
| 4 || 22 || 46 || 34 || 141 || 59 || 200 || 84 || 39 || 175 || 2.1 || 1.5 || 6.4 || 2.7 || 9.1 || 3.8 || 1.8 || 8.0
|- 
! scope="row" style="text-align:center" | 2011
|
| 4 || 18 || 31 || 22 || 148 || 69 || 217 || 85 || 40 || 130 || 1.7 || 1.2 || 8.2 || 3.8 || 12.1 || 4.7 || 2.2 || 7.2
|- style="background-color: #EAEAEA"
! scope="row" style="text-align:center" | 2012
|
| 4 || 21 || 39 || 31 || 176 || 79 || 255 || 106 || 32 || 158 || 1.9 || 1.5 || 8.4 || 3.8 || 12.1 || 5.0 || 1.5 || 7.5
|- 
! scope="row" style="text-align:center" | 2013
|
| 8 || 12 || 35 || 20 || 85 || 44 || 129 || 53 || 29 || 16 || 2.9 || 1.7 || 7.1 || 3.7 || 10.8 || 4.4 || 2.4 || 1.3
|- style="background-color: #EAEAEA"
! scope="row" style="text-align:center" | 2014
|
| 8 || 14 || 34 || 17 || 94 || 62 || 156 || 58 || 15 || 77 || 2.4 || 1.2 || 6.7 || 4.4 || 11.1 || 4.1 || 1.1 || 5.5
|- 
! scope="row" style="text-align:center" | 2015
|
| 8 || 22 || 44 || 23 || 146 || 121 || 267 || 93 || 68 || 380 || 2.0 || 1.0 || 6.6 || 5.5 || 12.1 || 4.2 || 3.1 || 17.3
|- style="background-color: #EAEAEA"
! scope="row" style="text-align:center" | 2016
|
| 8 || 17 || 17 || 8 || 120 || 104 || 224 || 49 || 43 || 419 || 1.0 || 0.5 || 7.1 || 6.1 || 13.2 || 2.9 || 2.5 || 24.6
|- 
! scope="row" style="text-align:center" | 2017
|
| 8 || 9 || 7 || 4 || 50 || 33 || 83 || 28 || 26 || 118 || 0.8 || 0.4 || 5.6 || 3.7 || 9.2 || 3.1 || 2.9 || 13.1
|- class="sortbottom"
! colspan=3| Career
! 178
! 325
! 207
! 1190
! 734
! 1924
! 696
! 384
! 1834
! 1.8
! 1.2
! 6.7
! 4.1
! 10.8
! 3.9
! 2.2
! 10.3
|}

Family

Personal life

During Kurt's two years with  he studied pharmacy at Griffith University on the Gold Coast. In 2021 he was approached by the Gold Coast Suns to work part time as a mentor to the club taller recruits.

See also
 Basketball experiment

References

External links

Sportspeople from the Gold Coast, Queensland
Adelaide Football Club players
Southport Australian Football Club players
West Adelaide Football Club players
Sydney Swans players
Australian rules footballers from Queensland
Living people
1987 births